Jaren Jamir Holmes (born Jaren Jamir English; November 24, 1998) is an American college basketball player for the Iowa State Cyclones of the Big 12 Conference. He previously played for the Ranger Rangers and St. Bonaventure Bonnies.

High school career
Holmes played basketball for University Liggett School in Grosse Pointe Woods, Michigan before transferring to Romulus Senior High School in Romulus, Michigan for his junior season. As a senior, he averaged 17 points, six rebounds and four assists per game. Holmes received no NCAA Division I offers out of high school.

College career
As a freshman, Holmes played for Ranger College. He averaged 12 points, five rebounds and two assists per game, helping his team reach the NJCAA Division I Championship Game. Holmes earned Second Team All-North Texas Junior College Athletic Conference honors. He transferred to St. Bonaventure for his sophomore season. Holmes averaged 11.9 points, 4.8 rebounds and 2.2 assists per game in his first year with the team. On January 6, 2021, he recorded a career-high 38 points and 10 rebounds, shooting 8-of-12 from three-point range, in an 83–57 win against Saint Joseph's. As a junior, Holmes averaged 13.8 points, 5.3 rebounds and two assists per game, and was named to the Second Team All-Atlantic 10. He averaged 13.5 points, five rebounds and 3.6 assists per game as a senior. Holmes opted to transfer to Iowa State for his final season of eligibility. He was named All-Big 12 Honorable Mention, and garnered a spot on the Big 12 All-Newcomer Team.

Career statistics

College

NCAA Division I

|-
| style="text-align:left;"| 2019–20
| style="text-align:left;"| St. Bonaventure
| 24 || 23 || 31.4 || .453 || .400 || .750 || 4.8 || 2.2 || .6 || .2 || 11.9
|-
| style="text-align:left;"| 2020–21
| style="text-align:left;"| St. Bonaventure
| 21 || 21 || 33.0 || .422 || .381 || .643 || 5.3 || 2.0 || .9 || .1 || 13.8
|-
| style="text-align:left;"| 2021–22
| style="text-align:left;"| St. Bonaventure
| 33 || 33 || 38.0 || .392 || .273 || .764 || 5.0 || 3.6 || 1.1 || .3 || 13.5
|- class="sortbottom"
| style="text-align:center;" colspan="2"| Career
| 78 || 77 || 34.1 || .422 || .352 || .720 || 5.0 || 2.6 || .9 || .2 || 13.1

JUCO

|-
| style="text-align:left;"| 2018–19
| style="text-align:left;"| Ranger
| 33 || 33 || – || .489 || .433 || .760 || 5.0 || 2.0 || 1.3 || .4 || 12.0

Personal life
Holmes' younger brother, William, was a fifth-round pick by the Los Angeles Angels in the 2018 Major League Baseball draft. In 2020, he legally changed his last name from English to Holmes in honor of his mother, Gia Holmes. Holmes co-authored two articles for fact-checking website PolitiFact.

References

External links
St. Bonaventure Bonnies bio
Ranger Rangers bio

1998 births
Living people
American men's basketball players
Basketball players from Michigan
People from Romulus, Michigan
Shooting guards
Ranger Rangers men's basketball players
St. Bonaventure Bonnies men's basketball players